State Highway 58 (abbreviated SH-58) is the name of two state highways in Oklahoma. The northern section has one lettered spur route, SH-58A.

SH-58 was originally a part of US-164. When US-164 was decommissioned in 1930, a section of the road in Major County that was left without a designation became SH-58. Since then, the highway has grown toward both the north and the south. With the designation and extension of the southern section of the highway, SH-58 is present in five counties in the western part of the state.

Route description

Southern section
The southern SH-58 begins at an intersection with State Highway 49 in Medicine Park in Comanche County. It heads north, passing Lake Lawtonka before meeting State Highway 19, which it overlaps for four miles (6.4 km). After splitting off, it meets State Highway 9 in Carnegie. It passes through the unincorporated community of Alfalfa, after which it has a two-mile (3.2 km) concurrency with State Highway 152.

After splitting from SH-152 near Eakly, SH-58 heads north to an interchange with Interstate 40, then passes through Hydro. Nine miles (14.5 km) later, it terminates at the Custer County line to become a county road, which eventually connects to State Highway 54.

Northern section
The northern SH-58 begins at US-270/281/SH-3/33 west of Watonga. It meets State Highway 51 near Canton and continues north through Longdale. In Fairview, the county seat of Major County, it shares a brief concurrency with U.S. Highway 60. Beginning in Fairview and heading east, SH-58 has a concurrency with State Highway 8, with which it switches places (south of the concurrency SH-8 runs to the east of SH-58, and north of it, SH-8 runs to the west of SH-58).

SH-58 continues north, meeting US-60 again near Ringwood. It then has a brief concurrency with State Highway 45 near Helena. Near Jet, it overlaps U.S. Highway 64 and SH-8. North of Cherokee, the Alfalfa County seat, US-64 splits off and State Highway 11 joins the three-route concurrency. North of Driftwood, SH-58 splits off on its own and passes through Byron and Amorita. It terminates at the Kansas state line, where it becomes a county road.

History
SH-58 was first commissioned some time between March 1, 1930 and December 1, 1931. The original extent of the route was much shorter than the present highway. In 1931, SH-58 was a dirt road extending from SH-8 east of Fairview north to Ringwood. Prior to receiving the SH-58 designation, this section of road was part of US-164 and the first SH-13. On May 29, 1930, AASHO approved an extension of US-60 that replaced US-164.  When US-60 replaced US-164 through the area, it was changed to the more westerly route it takes in the present day. The section of old U.S. highway that no longer had a designation became SH-58.

Throughout the 1930s, SH-58 was expanded in both directions. The first addition to the highway came during the first half of 1932, when the highway was extended north to Helena. No east–west highway existed at this point yet, leading to a spur end. The highway was extended to the south, replacing SH-44, to Canton on March 29, 1937.  SH-58 was extended north to the Kansas state line sometime between April 1937 and April 1938. This final extension brought SH-58's northern section to its present-day termini, and no major changes to the northern section have occurred since.

SH-58's southern section was first established on October 16, 1945, when SH-54 was given a new alignment further to the west; its old alignment was redesignated as SH-58. The original routing of SH-58's southern section began at US-277 in Cyril, continued west through Apache, and turned north at the present-day western intersection with SH-19. SH-58 continued north along its present alignment to Hydro, where it ended at US-66/SH-1.

In 1955, SH-19 was established through southern Caddo County, taking over the east–west section of SH-58. Thus, SH-58 was truncated to where it intersected with SH-19 (the present day western end of their concurrency). SH-58 was extended to its present terminus north of Hydro the next year. The highway was further extended in 1964, bringing the southern terminus to its present location near Medicine Park. No further routing changes have occurred since then.

SH-58A

SH-58 has one spur, SH-58A, a  route in Blaine County. The route begins at SH-58 near Longdale, and travels to Canton Lake. There, the highway runs across the dam impounding the lake. The highway then turns south and ends at SH-51 west of Canton.

Junction list

Southern section

Northern section

References

External links

Southern section at OKHighways
Northern section at OKHighways

058
Transportation in Comanche County, Oklahoma
Transportation in Caddo County, Oklahoma
Transportation in Blaine County, Oklahoma
Transportation in Custer County, Oklahoma
Transportation in Major County, Oklahoma
Transportation in Alfalfa County, Oklahoma